Purgatory Correctional Facility is the county jail of Washington County, Utah. Also known as the Washington County Jail, it is located near St. George, Utah, at Purgatory Flats, hence its unusual name.

Technically lying within the borders of Hurricane, Utah, the facility is about halfway between downtown St. George and downtown Hurricane at Harrisburg Junction (the junction of I-15 and SR-9). It has a semi-rural setting in the shadow of a steep ridge, part of the Virgin Rivers  anticline. The Virgin River flows north of the ridge. 

Purgatory Correctional Facility has a typical occupancy of 400 to 500 inmates, with 150 employees and a full-time medical clinic. The estimated cost of the facility, completed in 1998, was $11,570,000. It was designed by the architectural firm of Gillies, Stransky, Brems & Smith of Salt Lake City. Situated on South 5200 West Road, the Correctional Facility is located within a growing business park area, including the Fairgrounds Industrial Park and the Quail Creek Industrial Park. Tenants nearby include the Washington County Department of Motor Vehicles; to the north is Washington County Regional Fair Park which includes Dixie Downs, a horse racing track, and the Southern Utah Shooting Sports Park. Also nearby, Walmart has a large distribution center.

In order to cut its operating costs, as well as to reduce recidivism, in 2008 the Sheriff's Office began charging inmates to stay at the jail, which is co-ed. In 2005 it had a recidivism rate of 75 percent.

The Purgatory jail made headlines in 2006 when it was the scene of incarceration for Warren Jeffs, following his flight from justice. He stayed there for twelve months before trial and conviction for two first degree felony counts of rape, at which time he was transferred to Utah State Prison.

References

Further reading
 Robert Levi Christensen, No Sunshine in Dixie: Purgatory Correctional Facility, PublishAmerica (now America Star Books), 2010

External links
 Human Flower Project: Flowers in Purgatory

Prisons in Utah
Buildings and structures in Washington County, Utah
1998 establishments in Utah